Bunaea aslauga, the Madagascar emperor moth, is an African moth belonging to the family Saturniidae. The species was first described by William Forsell Kirby in 1877. It has been found in Kenya and in Madagascar

It has a wingspan of 100–150 mm .

Food plants
One of its food plants is Intsia bijuga, a species in the family Fabaceae.

References

Moths described in 1877
Saturniinae
Moths of Madagascar
Moths of Africa